Kairabah is a rural locality in the City of Logan, Queensland, Australia. In the  Kairabah had a population of 0 people.

History 
On 28 November 2014, a portion of Yarrabilba was excised to create a new locality, Kairabah. The name Kairabah was proposed by Lend Lease Group (the property developers) from a suggestion by the Yugambeh Museum. It means "Place of White Cockatoo" and is derived from the Yugambeh language.

In the  Kairabah had a population of 0 people.

Development 
As at 2015, Kairabah is unoccupied. Roads and water infrastructure will be developed, followed by residential development over the following several years.

References

Planned residential developments
Suburbs of Logan City
Localities in Queensland